Alan Beeton (born 4 October 1978) is an English former footballer who played in the Football League for Wycombe Wanderers.

References

1978 births
Living people
Sportspeople from Watford
English footballers
Association football defenders
Wycombe Wanderers F.C. players
Chesham United F.C. players
English Football League players